OpenNIC (also referred to as the OpenNIC Project) is a user-owned and -controlled top-level Network Information Center that offers a non-national alternative to traditional top-level domain (TLD) registries such as ICANN. As of January 2017, OpenNIC recognizes and peers all existing ICANN TLDs, for compatibility reasons. However, OpenNIC has not yet evaluated and does not hold a formal position on future ICANN TLDs.

In addition to resolving hostnames in the ICANN root, OpenNIC also resolves hostnames in OpenNIC-operated namespaces, as well as within namespaces with which peering agreements have been established. Some OpenNIC recursive servers (Tier 2 servers) are known for their high speeds and low latency, relative to other more widely used DNS recursors, as well as their anonymizing or no-logging policies. Many servers offer DNSCrypt. Tier 2 servers are operated by community volunteers across a multitude of geographic locations.

Like all alternative root DNS systems, OpenNIC-hosted domains are unreachable to the vast majority of Internet users, because they require a non-default configuration in one's DNS resolver.

History 
On June 1, 2000, an article was posted on kuro5hin.org advocating a democratically governed domain name system. The first OpenNIC servers went into operation July of that year.

OpenNIC TLDs

OpenNIC namespaces 
These TLDs are currently served by OpenNIC and were constructed with the approval of the OpenNIC community.

Peering agreements 
OpenNIC provides resolution of select other alternative DNS roots.

New Nations 
New Nations provides TLDs for nation-states that are not recognized by the ISO 3166-1 alpha-2 standard, and therefore haven't received their own ccTLD. Currently they provide .ku (Kurdish people), .te (Tamil Eelam), .ti (Tibet), and .uu (Uyghur people).

FurNIC 
FurNIC aims to bring a unique identity to Furries, Furry Fandom, and other Anthropomorphic interest websites across the internet. FurNIC and OpenNIC work closely, with .fur (Furry fandom) generally being treated as part of OpenNIC for most purposes, rather than a separate peer entity.

Emercoin 
On January 15, 2015, domains registered in Emercoin's blockchain became accessible to all users of OpenNIC DNS. Emercoin DNS supports the domain zones .bazar, .coin, .emc, .lib, .ness and .sky. However, Emercoin DNS records can be registered/maintained from within the Emercoin software, and not as part of OpenNIC's management system.

Technical zones 
OpenNIC operates some special-use TLDs, which are meant for technical or organizational purposes.

Suspended peering

Namecoin 
In July 2019 the OpenNIC community voted 13-2 for dropping support for .bit domains due to them "being used as malware hubs" as a result of their "anonymous nature". A similar proposal was made in December 2018 but it did not reach the voting stage.

Until then OpenNIC resolved .bit (Namecoin) domains through the use of a centralized server which generated a DNS zone from the Namecoin blockchain. Access was provided through a Tier 1 server which bridges the OpenNIC system and Namecoin. Some OpenNIC DNS servers made use of a Spamhaus-maintained blacklist of malicious .bit domains.

See also 
 ICANN
 Namecoin
 Open Root Server Network
 Public recursive name servers
 OpenDNS
 Google Public DNS
 CloudFlare Public DNS

References

External links 
 

Domain Name System
Alternative Internet DNS services